Wenona Benally is an American politician and a Democratic member of the Arizona House of Representatives elected to represent District 7 from 2017 to 2019. She previously ran for the U.S. House to represent Arizona's 1st congressional district. Benally is a member of the Navajo Nation.

Elections
 2016 Benally and Eric Descheenie were unopposed in the Democratic Primary and the general election.
 2012 Benally ran in the 2012 election for the U.S. House to represent Arizona's 1st District. She was defeated by former congresswomen Ann Kirkpatrick who went on to win the general election.

References

External links
 Biography at Ballotpedia

Living people
21st-century American politicians
21st-century American women politicians
21st-century Native Americans
Candidates in the 2012 United States elections
Harvard Law School alumni
Democratic Party members of the Arizona House of Representatives
Native American state legislators in Arizona
Native American women in politics
Navajo people
People from Flagstaff, Arizona
Women state legislators in Arizona
Year of birth missing (living people)
21st-century Native American women